Lepori is an Italian surname. Notable people with the surname include:

Giuseppe Lepori (1902–1968), Swiss politician
Mauro-Giuseppe Lepori (born 1959), Swiss Roman Catholic clergy
Paolo Lepori (born 1959), Italian sprint canoeist
Pierre Lepori (born 1968), Swiss translator and writer
Richard Lepori (born 1991), Italian rugby league player

Italian-language surnames